Trading My Sorrows: The Best of Darrell Evans is a compilation of Christian worship music by Darrell Evans released in 2002.

Track listing 
"Fields of Grace (live)" (Darrell Evans) - from All I Want Is You
"Freedom" (Evans) - from Freedom
"All We Want Is You" (Evans) - from All I Want Is You
"New Song Arisin'" (Evans) - from You Are I AM
"We Will Embrace Your Move" (Evans) - from You Are I AM
"Let the River Flow" (Evans) - from You Are I AM
"My Home is You (live)" (Evans) - from All I Want Is You
"You Bless Me" (Evans and Ben Ferrell) - from Freedom
"So Good to Me" (Evans and Matt Jones) - from Freedom
"Trading My Sorrows" (Evans) - from Freedom
"Down at Your Feet" (Evans) - from All I Want Is You
"Your Love Is Extravagant" (Evans) - from Freedom
"Whom Shall I Fear" (Evans) - from You Are I AM
"I Am Yours" (Evans) - from You Are I AM
"Lay My Life Down (live)" (Evans) - from All I Want Is You

2002 albums
Darrell Evans (musician) albums